The German International School Washington D.C. (GISW), formerly Deutsche Schule Washington D.C. (DSW),. As one of over 140 schools in the network of German Schools around the globe, the GISW has a strong focus on STEM subjects and world languages. The student body encompasses students age 2 in preschool through 12th grade. As of the school year 2022/23, knowledge of German is not required for admission to preschool though Grade 6. German language learning support is provided. The diplomas granted at the end of twelfth grade are the German International Abitur (DIA) and a High School Diploma. These degrees provide students access to the best universities all around the world. Information about the German International Abitur: www.germanapproach.org

GISW is the first MINT-EC school in the United States of America.

On Saturdays, German Language Courses are offered for students age 3 through adults. In the Saturday program students can attain the Deutsche Sprachdiplom 1 and 2. (DSD1 and DSD2).

History
The school was founded on September 11, 1961, with 33 students. Its original purpose was to deliver a German education to the children of diplomats in the Washington, D.C., area, though as it has grown over the years it has taken on a larger number of other students. The school is partially supported by the German government.

The school was previously in McLean, Virginia.

See also
 German Americans

References

External links 
Web Site German School Homepage (English version)
Web Site German School Washington Homepage (German Version)
Web Site German International Abitur 
https://www.auslandsschulwesen.de/Webs/ZfA/DE/Home/home_node.html
https://www.kmk.org/
https://www.auslandsschulnetz.de/
https://www.pasch-net.de/de/index.html
https://www.mint-ec.de/

Washington
German-American culture in Maryland
German-American culture in Washington, D.C.
Educational institutions established in 1961
Private K-12 schools in Montgomery County, Maryland
Preparatory schools in Maryland
1961 establishments in Maryland
Schools in Potomac, Maryland